Bright's Passage is the debut novel by singer/songwriter Josh Ritter. It is published by Dial Press and was released June 28, 2011. The first chapter had been previously released for free download on Ritter's official website.

Blurb
The novel follows a young, widowed veteran of the First World War, Henry Bright, as he and his infant son, along with an unlikely guardian angel flee from a forest fire and Bright's cruel in-laws. Shifting between their strange journey through West Virginia's hickory-canopied foothills, Bright's plausible memories of the trenches of France, and recollections from his childhood, the novel is at times suspenseful and kinetic, quiet and eerie, and at times humorous.

References

2011 American novels
Novels set in West Virginia
Dial Press books
Novels set during World War I
2011 debut novels